Meritastis pyrosemana is a moth of the family Tortricidae. It is known from Australia, including the Australian Capital Territory, Tasmania and Victoria.

The wingspan is about 20 mm. Adults males have grey wings with dark marks on the costa of each forewing. In the female, these markings are paler but outlined in black. The hindwings are pale brown with darker veins.

References

Epitymbiini